Vasco César Freire de Seabra (born 15 September 1983) is a Portuguese football manager.

Club career
Born in Paços de Ferreira, Seabra played youth football for F.C. Paços de Ferreira as a forward and a central midfielder, retiring at the age of 18. After assistant spells, he started working as a manager in his own right in early 2013, with amateurs F.C. Lixa in the Porto Football Association.

Seabra was appointed at Paços de Ferreira in late November 2016, replacing Carlos Pinto. He won his first Primeira Liga game 2–1 against Boavista F.C. on 5 December, and ended the season in 13th. He was dismissed on 23 October 2017 after a 6–1 away loss to FC Porto, with the team in that same position and eliminated from the Taça de Portugal.

On 24 January 2018, Seabra returned to management with F.C. Famalicão in LigaPro, on a deal until the end of the following campaign. However, in June that year, he was replaced by Sérgio Vieira with a year left on his contract.

Seabra was hired on a year-long contract at C.D. Mafra on 31 May 2019, tasked with keeping them in the second division. Having finished in fourth, and also taken the club to the last 16 of the domestic cup by eliminating top-tier Moreirense F.C. away from home, he resigned.

In July 2020, Seabra returned to the top flight at Boavista F.C. on a two-year deal. He left on 8 December, having won once and drawn five of his nine matches. A month later, he signed for Moreirense until June 2022. His contract was terminated a year early following an eighth-place finish, and he was replaced by João Henriques.

On 13 November 2021, Seabra became C.S. Marítimo's second manager of the season after taking over from Julio Velázquez, with the side being placed second-bottom. He was himself relieved of his duties the following 5 September, after five losses in as many games to kickstart 2022–23.

Managerial statistics

References

External links

1983 births
Living people
People from Paços de Ferreira
Sportspeople from Porto District
Portuguese footballers
Association football midfielders
F.C. Paços de Ferreira players
Portuguese football managers
Primeira Liga managers
Liga Portugal 2 managers
F.C. Paços de Ferreira managers
F.C. Famalicão managers
Boavista F.C. managers
Moreirense F.C. managers
C.S. Marítimo managers